Yann Aurel Ludger Bisseck (born 29 November 2000) is a German professional footballer who plays as a centre-back for Danish Superliga club AGF.

Club career
Bisseck made his debut for 1. FC Köln against Hertha BSC on 26 November 2017 at the age of 16, making him the youngest player in Köln's history and the youngest ever German player to appear in the Bundesliga. Bisseck's appearance also made him the second youngest player in league history, only behind Nuri Şahin.

On 17 January 2019, he was loaned out to Holstein Kiel until the end of 2019–20 season. After briefly returning to his home club in the summer of 2020, the club announced that Bisseck would join Portuguese side Vitória de Guimarães on a two-year loan deal. However, the loan arrangement ended after one year and Bisseck was sent to Danish Superliga side AGF on a new one-year loan. On 27 October 2021, AGF confirmed that the club had triggered his buying option and signed a permanent deal until June 2026, which according to the club took immediate effect from 27 October 2021.

Personal life
Born in Germany, Bisseck is of Cameroonian descent. He is a youth international for Germany.

Honours
Individual
Fritz Walter Medal U19 Bronze: 2019

References

External links
 Profile at DFB.de
 Profile at kicker.de
 

2000 births
Living people
Footballers from Cologne
German footballers
Germany youth international footballers
Germany under-21 international footballers
German expatriate footballers
German people of Cameroonian descent
German sportspeople of African descent
Association football defenders
1. FC Köln players
1. FC Köln II players
Holstein Kiel players
Roda JC Kerkrade players
Vitória S.C. players
Vitória S.C. B players
Aarhus Gymnastikforening players
Bundesliga players
2. Bundesliga players
Regionalliga players
Eerste Divisie players
Danish Superliga players
German expatriate sportspeople in the Netherlands
German expatriate sportspeople in Portugal
German expatriate sportspeople in Denmark 
Expatriate footballers in the Netherlands
Expatriate footballers in Portugal
Expatriate men's footballers in Denmark